Mylapore is a legislative assembly constituency in the Chennai district of the Indian state of Tamil Nadu. Its State Assembly Constituency number is 25. It covers Mylapore and surrounding localities, such as Alwarpet, Raja Annamalaipuram, Foreshore Estate and Santhome. Mylapore assembly constituency is a part of Chennai South parliamentary constituency. It is one of the 234 State Legislative Assembly Constituencies in Tamil Nadu, in India.

Madras State

Tamil Nadu

Election results

2021

2016

2011

2006

2001

1996

1994 By-election

"

1991

1989

1984

1980

1977

1971

1967

1962

1957

1952

References 

 

Assembly constituencies of Tamil Nadu
Chennai district